Thomas Colin Ballard (born 26 November 1989) is an Australian comedian, radio and television presenter.

Early life 
Ballard was born to parents Judy and Neil Ballard and grew up in Warrnambool, Victoria. He attended Brauer Secondary College, graduating in 2007 as School Captain and Dux and achieving an Equivalent National Tertiary Entrance Rank of 99.80 in his Victorian Certificate of Education (VCE). He was consequently named as the dux of the South West Region. He then briefly studied law at Monash University.

He was also awarded the VCAA's 2007 VCE Achiever's Award. During his VCE year, Ballard competed in and won the VCAA's Plain English Speaking Award with a speech titled "bullying.com".  He went on to place second in the national competition to Daniel Swain, with the two being chosen to represent Australia in the International Public Speaking Competition held in London in May 2008. His success in the public speaking competition and his activism with school and local youth communities on topics such as anti-homosexuality and cyberbullying helped earn him the Achiever's Award.

Career

Stand-up comedy 
He was a three-time Class Clowns National Finalist and a Raw Comedy National Finalist by 2006. He performed in Upwey, Warburton, Healesville and Lilydale as part of the Young Blood Comedy Tour in 2007 and was a guest entertainer in the 2007 Melbourne Comedy Festival's Eskimo Jokes show.

He was one of the "stars of the future" (along with Jacques Barrett, Lila Tillman, and Jack Druce) who were collectively promoted by the 2008 Melbourne International Comedy Festival as the "four freshest and funniest new talents we could find" and featured in the Festivals' Comedy Zone.

Radio 
Ballard was a presenter for Warrnambool's 3WAY FM community radio station with Alex Dyson. On the strength of his Raw Comedy performance, Ballard was given the chance to develop some demos with Australian youth radio station Triple J and, along with Dyson, was given regular Mid-Dawn (1am to 6 am) shifts.

In December 2008, Ballard and Dyson were the presenters for the weekday summer lunch slot (10 am to 2 pm) and in 2009 moved to the weekend breakfast slot. On 23 November 2009, Triple J announced that Ballard and Dyson would take over as hosts of the 2010 Breakfast show.

In November 2013, Ballard resigned from Triple J after 7 years with the station to focus on his stand-up comedy.

Television 
Ballard has appeared on Q&A, Celebrity Name Game, The Project, Show Me the Movie! and Hughesy, We Have a Problem.

In 2014, Ballard hosted Reality Check, a panel discussion program about reality television. In 2015, he hosted 18 June and 26 October episodes of Q&A.

In 2016, Ballard was cast in the second season of SBS TV series First Contact.

In 2017, Ballard was appointed host of news and culture TV program on ABC Comedy, Tonightly with Tom Ballard.

Ballard appeared on the panel show Patriot Brains in 2021.

Personal life 
Ballard is gay. He and comedian Josh Thomas were each other's first boyfriend with Thomas describing Ballard as "much more assertively open and gay, and earnest." As their two and a half year relationship was ending in 2010, Thomas was on tour with his show Surprise, "all about being young, gay and in love for the first time."  Ballard premiered his show, Since 1989, at the Belvoir St Theatre the following year.  Dealing with his childhood and first relationship, and largely written prior to the break-up, Ballard described the experience as giving him "an element of closure" allowing him to "sign off and say this is what I felt about this time."

Ballard describes himself as "gay Gen Y middle-class public school-educated son of left-leaning-parents." He is an atheist and critic of religion.

Sexual assault allegations 

In June 2014, Adelaide Comedian JooYung Roberts went to the South Australia Police alleging that Ballard had sexually assaulted him in a hotel room after a comedy show. In 2018, Roberts, inspired by the #metoo movement, published a statement on his Facebook page, stating that after striking up a conversation at the hotel bar, Ballard invited Mr Roberts, then 20 years old, up to his hotel room then kissed and fondled him without his consent. In the post Roberts stated that, "It was a traumatising experience for many reasons, one of those being I’m a heterosexual". In response, Ballard released a statement on his website denying the allegation "in the strongest terms possible" and insisting the encounter was "consensual".

Political views and advocacy
Ballard hosted the ABC political and cultural comedy commentary program Tonightly with Tom Ballard. He has used his comedy to advocate on a range of political issues.

He has written and spoken of his hatred for conservative columnists Miranda Devine, Andrew Bolt and Janet Albrechtsen and broadcaster Alan Jones. In 2012, he published "My Letter to Miranda Devine" in which he strongly criticised Devine for writing that "the ideal situation for a child to be raised in is an intact family with a father and a mother".

Ballard has been a vocal critic of Australian government policy towards asylum seekers. In 2016 he told SBS: "I've found myself getting really angry about the way we treat refugees as a country. I figured if I could take that passion and interest and funnel it into my comedy I might come up with something that would be a different way for people to engage with the whole topic." In 2017 Ballard told the ABC "I'm a painful atheist and bang on about it quite regularly in my comedy", but added that his "strident atheism" had been tempered in recent years through his involvement in refugee advocacy and meeting faith leaders in that space "living the best values of the Christian teaching."

In 2016, Ballard signed an open letter to the editors of The Australian newspaper condemning that paper's decision to publish a Bill Leak cartoon depicting a neglectful Aboriginal father.

In 2018, a senior ABC executive apologised to Australian Conservatives candidate Kevin Bailey after he was labelled a "cunt" ahead of the Batman by-election on Ballard's Tonightly program.

Tonightly with Tom Ballard was dropped from the ABC line up and aired for the last time on 7 September 2018. This followed an ABC review which determined the show failed to meet a quality threshold.

On 23 September Ballard endorsed the Victorian Socialists for the 2018 Victorian State Election.

Discography

Albums

Awards and nominations

ARIA Music Awards
The ARIA Music Awards are a set of annual ceremonies presented by Australian Recording Industry Association (ARIA), which recognise excellence, innovation, and achievement across all genres of the music of Australia. They commenced in 1987.

! 
|-
| 2013 || The Bits We're Least Ashamed of (with Alex Dyson) || rowspan="2"|  ARIA Award for Best Comedy Release ||  || rowspan="2"| 
|-
| 2018 || "Sex Pest" (with Bridie and Wyatt) ||  
|-

References

External links 

 
 Profile on Triple J

1989 births
ARIA Award winners
Australian socialists
Australian male comedians
Australian gay actors
Gay comedians
Australian atheists
Critics of religions
Living people
People from Warrnambool
Triple J announcers
RMITV alumni
Helpmann Award winners
Australian LGBT comedians